Justiniana (Yanka) Gerdjikova Kanevcheva (11 June 1878 – 3 March 1920) was a Bulgarian revolutionary, a member of the Internal Macedonian Revolutionary Organization.

Biography
Yanka Kanevcheva was born in Ohrid in 1878. Later her parents moved to Sofia where she graduated from high school and continued to follow philosophy at Sofia University. Kanevcheva joined the IMORO and participated in the female revolutionary group led by teacher Slavka Pushkarova from Struga, together with Lyuba Kuppeva from Veles, Macedonia and Amalia Pridjianova, later the wife of Clement Shapkarev. This group acted as fundraisers for the organisation.

She was favored by Gotse Delchev. In 1900, she planned with Delchev, Gyorche Petrov and Boris Sarafov the kidnapping of Nikola Geshov, the son of Ivan Evstratiev Geshov, but this was abandoned as the Geshov family left for Paris.

After the death of Delchev, Kanevcheva married Mihail Gerdzhikov. From their marriage have a daughter - Magdalene. She died in 1920 from tuberculosis.

He died in Plovdiv, or Sofia, Bulgaria, or according to other data in Switzerland.

References

Bibliography

1878 births
1920 deaths
People from Ohrid
Members of the Internal Macedonian Revolutionary Organization
Sofia University alumni
Macedonian Bulgarians
People from the Ottoman Empire